Juno & The Dismemberment Plan is a split EP by Juno and the Dismemberment Plan, released in 2001 on DeSoto Records.

Track listing
Tracks 1 & 4 were recorded by the Dismemberment Plan, while tracks 2 & 3 were recorded by Juno.
"The Dismemberment Plan Gets Rich" – 2:22	
"Non-Equivalents" – 3:26	
"High Noon" (DJ Shadow) – 3:46
"Crush" (Jennifer Paige) – 6:14

References

2001 EPs
DeSoto Records albums
The Dismemberment Plan albums
Juno (band) albums
Split EPs